Molochnaya is a rural locality (a station) in Mayskoye Rural Settlement, Vologodsky District, Vologda Oblast, Russia. The population was 33 as of 2002.

Geography 
The distance to Vologda is 24 km, to Mayskoye is 5 km. Bovykino is the nearest rural locality.

References 

Rural localities in Vologodsky District